Vrhnika pri Ložu is a village southeast of Stari Trg in the Municipality of Loška Dolina in the Inner Carniola region of Slovenia.

Church

The local church in the settlement is dedicated to Saint Francis Xavier and belongs to the Parish of Stari Trg. Its construction was begun in 1735.

Notable people
Notable people that were born or lived in Vrhnika pri Ložu include:
Feliks Razdrih (a.k.a. Stane, 1901–?), communist politician

References

External links

Vrhnika pri Ložu on Geopedia

Populated places in the Municipality of Loška Dolina